Petar Vasilev (born 20 June 1983) is a Bulgarian retired footballer who played as a defender.

External links 
 

Bulgarian footballers
1983 births
Living people
Footballers from Sofia
PFC Lokomotiv Mezdra players
PFC Spartak Pleven players
FC Sportist Svoge players
FC Pirin Razlog players
FC Septemvri Sofia players
First Professional Football League (Bulgaria) players
Second Professional Football League (Bulgaria) players

Association football defenders